Pilot Point may refer to:
 Pilot Point, Alaska
 Pilot Point, Texas